The 1944 Michigan State Spartans football team represented Michigan State College as an independent in the 1944 college football season. In their 11th season under head coach Charlie Bachman, the Spartans compiled a 6–1 record. The 1944 Spartans lost only to Missouri by a 13 to 7 score. The team did not play its annual rivalry game with Michigan.

Schedule

References

Michigan State
Michigan State Spartans football seasons
Michigan State Spartans football